

This is a list of the National Register of Historic Places listings in Ventura County, California.

This is intended to be a complete list of the properties and districts on the National Register of Historic Places in Ventura County, California, United States. Latitude and longitude coordinates are provided for many National Register properties and districts; these locations may be seen together in an online map.

There are 38 properties and districts listed on the National Register in the county, including 1 National Historic Landmark.

Current listings

|}

See also

List of National Historic Landmarks in California
National Register of Historic Places listings in California
California Historical Landmarks in Ventura County, California
 Ventura County Historic Landmarks & Points of Interest
 City of Ventura Historic Landmarks and Districts

References

 01
Ventura
.
.
.